Geotrupes balyi, or Baly's earth boring beetle, is a species of earth-boring scarab beetle in the family Geotrupidae. It is found in North America.

References

Further reading

 

Geotrupidae
Articles created by Qbugbot
Beetles described in 1865